Sampot chang samluy is a tube garment wrap around the lower body, length to foot, worn by a large community in Cambodia. As an important style divided from traditional Sampot tied with the ancient Sompot Chong Kben, the outfit was originally prefer by most Khmer women until the 16th century of the Longvek era. It attracted a large number of Noblemen in the Javanese's fashion influenced, known more as Sarong. However, the somloy represented a more female National costume along with Sbai for Cambodia.

The attire already been converted into Thai court along with the large of Khmer clothing since the fall of the Khmer Empire.

History 

Sompot Chong Somloy has been worn in Cambodia since the Funan period (1st - 6th century) and it has been seen on numerous statues of that period. It's the most popular skirt for Khmer women in that period and continued until the present.

See also
Sompot Chong Kben
Sampot
Sbai
Khmer Traditional Dress
Sarong

References

Cambodian clothing
Skirts
Folk costumes